Denton is an unincorporated community in Pemiscot County, in the U.S. state of Missouri.

The community has the name of Neil V. Denton, the original owner of the site.

Demographics

Education
South Pemiscot Schools is the local school district.

References

Unincorporated communities in Pemiscot County, Missouri
Unincorporated communities in Missouri